Abdelkrim Krai (born 27 February 1997) is an Algerian Paralympic athlete who specializes in middle-distance running.

Career
Krai represented Algeria at the 2020 Summer Paralympics in the 1500 metres T38 event and own a silver medal.

References

1997 births
Living people
People from Bordj Bou Arréridj
Algerian male middle-distance runners
Medalists at the World Para Athletics Championships
Paralympic athletes of Algeria
Athletes (track and field) at the 2020 Summer Paralympics
Medalists at the 2020 Summer Paralympics
Paralympic silver medalists for Algeria
Paralympic medalists in athletics (track and field)
21st-century Algerian people
20th-century Algerian people